The Iron Heel is a 1919 Soviet silent film directed by Vladimir Gardin. It is based on Jack London's 1908 novel The Iron Heel.

The main theme of London's book was the rise of a mass Socialist movement in the United States, with the potential to take power and implement a radical Socialist program, and its suppression by a well-organized coup of conservative Oligarchs. This had direct relevance to the situation in Russia at the time when the film was made, when the Russian Civil War was still raging and the newly created Soviet regime, born of the October Revolution, was still threatened by the counter-revolutionary White armies.

Cast
 Olga Bonus 
 Anatoli Gorchilin 
 Aleksandra Khokhlova 
 Ivan Khudoleyev 
 Leonid Leonidov 
 Olga Preobrazhenskaya 
 Nina Shaternikova
 Nikolai Znamensky

See also
 The Iron Heel of Oligarchy

References

Bibliography 
 Christie, Ian & Taylor, Richard. The Film Factory: Russian and Soviet Cinema in Documents 1896–1939. Routledge, 2012.

External links 
 

1919 films
Soviet silent films
1910s Russian-language films
Films based on works by Jack London
Films directed by Vladimir Gardin
Films based on science fiction novels
Soviet black-and-white films
Films based on American novels